Dame Carolyn Julia McCall  (born 13 September 1961) is a British  businesswoman of Scottish and Irish descent. She has been the chief executive of ITV since 2018. She previously served as the chief executive of easyJet from 2010 to 2017.

Early life and career 
McCall was born on 13 September 1961 in Bangalore, India.  Her Scottish father, Arthur McCall, ran the Far East division of a US textile multinational and her Irish-born mother, Colleen McCall, worked for the British High Commission in India. She was educated in India and Singapore until her teens, then at a Roman Catholic girls' boarding school in Derbyshire. She studied for a BA degree in history and politics at the University of Kent, Canterbury, where she met future husband, Peter Frawley. The couple have three children (Emmeline, Max, and Dan) and live in Berkhamsted.

On graduation she began training as a teacher, completing a year at Holland Park School. She then gained a master's degree in politics from the University of London, and subsequently joined construction group Costain. She was offered a job on Kevin Kelly's Business magazine.

McCall was a non-executive director of Lloyds TSB (2008–2009), New Look (1999–2005, a position to which she was reappointed in 2010); and Tesco (2005–2008), a position from which she resigned after Tesco sued The Guardian for libel. She was chair of the Business in the Community project Opportunity Now, She has served as president of Women in Advertising and Communications London.

Guardian Media Group 
McCall applied to be a research planner at The Guardian, which she joined in 1986. As she rose through the Guardian Media Group behind Marland, Management Today magazine called her "one of the toughest operators to have risen through The Guardian Media Group's ranks." 

After rising to become CEO of Guardian Newspapers Ltd (now Guardian News & Media Ltd) in August 2006, she became CEO of the Guardian Media Group. During her tenure the Manchester Evening News and regionally based business were sold to Trinity Mirror, and a 49.9% stake in Trader Media Group was sold to Apax Partners, in a deal that valued the business at £1.35bn.

EasyJet 
On 24 March 2010, McCall's appointment as the chief executive of EasyJet was announced. She was said to prefer a "pragmatic approach to human resources rather than politically correct niceties". McCall became one of five female CEOs of a FTSE 100 Index company.

During McCall's tenure at EasyJet, the airline's shares almost quadrupled, and McCall arranged for the airline to "snatch up pieces" of Air Berlin and Alitalia.

McCall's departure from EasyJet was announced on 17 July 2017 after seven years at the company. Michael O'Leary, the CEO of rival Ryanair, said the airline industry would have been poorer without her; "I clearly underestimated her and I was proved wrong. She forced us to up our game on customer service. EasyJet and the industry are better as a result of her tenure." Willie Walsh, chief executive of the British Airways parent International Airlines Group, said he was "sorry to see Carolyn [McCall] leave".

McCall left EasyJet with a £5 million payment. The company appointed Johan Lundgren, then deputy chief executive of TUI Group, as her successor.

ITV 
On 8 January 2018, following seven years as easyJet chief executive, McCall became the first female chief executive of commercial broadcaster ITV. She replaced Adam Crozier in the role.

She is a creator of BritBox, a subscription video service venture in partnership with the BBC which launched of late 2019 in the UK. She said "It's quite bold, going into a market which Netflix has already been in for eight years."

McCall earned a £3.7 million salary at ITV in 2018. Her 2019 base salary was set to increase by 2.5 per cent "in line with the wider employee group". In April 2020, McCall along with other senior executives took a 20% pay cut in the wake of the coronavirus pandemic.

McCall serves as a non-executive board member in the Department for Business, Energy and Industrial Strategy.

Awards and honours 
McCall was named Veuve Clicquot Businesswoman of the Year in April 2008, and was appointed Officer of the Order of the British Empire (OBE) in the 2008 Birthday Honours for services to women in business.

In February 2013, she was assessed as one of the 100 most powerful women in the United Kingdom by Woman's Hour on BBC Radio 4.

In June 2014, McCall was awarded a Doctor of Science Honoris Causa by Cranfield University in recognition of her outstanding contribution to the aerospace industry and her distinguished achievements in international business. She was appointed Dame Commander of the Order of the British Empire (DBE) in the 2016 New Year Honours for services to the aviation industry.

References

External links 
Biography at easyJet

1961 births
Living people
Businesspeople from Bangalore
Alumni of the University of Kent
Alumni of the University of London
English chief executives
Dames Commander of the Order of the British Empire
Guardian Media Group
British corporate directors
British television executives
British people of Scottish descent
British people of Irish descent
Women television executives
ITV people